Rodman is a hamlet and census-designated place (CDP) in the town of Rodman, Jefferson County, New York, United States. As of the 2010 census, the CDP population was 153, out of 1,176 in the entire town of Rodman.

Geography
The hamlet of Rodman is in southern Jefferson County in the western part of the town of Rodman. It is in the valley of Sandy Creek, a direct tributary of Lake Ontario, and sits just southwest (downstream) of the creek's confluence with Gulf Stream.

Demographics

References

Census-designated places in New York (state)
Census-designated places in Jefferson County, New York